Ángel Sanz Briz (28 September 1910 – 11 June 1980) was a Spanish diplomat who served the government of Spain at its Embassy in Budapest (Hungary) during World War II. He saved the lives of some five thousand Hungarian Jews from deportation to Auschwitz. Sanz Briz is sometimes referred to as "the angel of Budapest".

Early life
Sanz Briz was born on 28 September 1910 in Zaragoza. He earned a degree in law at the Central University of Madrid, and then in 1933 entered the diplomatic School in Madrid.  At the beginning of the Spanish Civil War he volunteered to join the Nationalist side in response to the atrocities of the socialist-communist terror plot from the government of Largo Caballero. Sanz Briz served as a truck driver in the Cuerpo de Ejército Marroquí, a unit of Francisco Franco's army created in 1937 and commanded by General Juan Yagüe. In that same armed conflict and on the same side he fought the one who, years later would be one of his main collaborators in Budapest, the Italian Giorgio Perlasca.

Diplomatic career

After completing his studies in Madrid, his first diplomatic posting was to Cairo. He was sent to Budapest in 1942 where he was the first secretary of the Spanish legation.

Between June and December 1944 - November, according to Giorgio Perlasca<ref>United States Holocaust Memorial Museum, Oral history interview with Giorgio Perlasca',  part 2 of 5</ref> - he and his assistants issued fake Spanish papers to 5,200 Jews, saving them from deportation to concentration camps. He initially received authorization to provide papers to 200 Jews, and continued to enlarge this amount until he reached 5,200. In some cases, he acquired houses in Budapest at his own cost in order to provide shelter for the refugees, which made the difference between life and death for those Jews.

He convinced the Hungarian authorities that Spain, under the dictator Miguel Primo de Rivera, had given Spanish citizenship to descendants of Sephardic Jews expelled from Spain in 1492. Primo de Rivera had issued such a decree on 20 December 1924 but it had been canceled in 1930, a fact the Hungarian authorities were not aware of. Sanz Briz dutifully informed the Spanish Foreign Ministry of his actions, that were deliberately permitted by Madrid through administrative silence, a typical diplomatic procedure used to not compromise the chancellery.

In 1944, as the Red Army approached Budapest, he followed government orders to leave for Switzerland. He was replaced by the Italian Giorgio Perlasca, who pretended to be a Spanish consul and continued to issue Spanish visas and to patrol the safehouse system for Jews set up by Sanz Briz.

After these events, Sanz Briz continued his diplomatic career: he was posted to San Francisco and Washington, D.C., Ambassador to Lima, Bern, Bayonne, Guatemala, The Hague, Brussels and China (1973, where he became the first Spanish Ambassador). In 1976 he was sent to Rome as Ambassador of Spain to the Holy See, where he died on 11 June 1980.

Sanz Briz himself tells how he was able to save the lives of so many Jews, in Federico Ysart's book Los judíos en España (1973). He is also the subject of the 2011 Spanish television series El ángel de Budapest, based on Diego Carcedo's book Un español frente al Holocausto ("A Spaniard against the Holocaust").

Personal life
In 1942 he married Adela Quijano y Secades, with whom he had five children: Adela, Paloma, Pilar, Ángela, and Juan Carlos.

Death and recognition
Sanz Briz died on 11 June 1980 in Rome.

In 1991, he was recognized by the Holocaust Museum Yad Vashem of the State of Israel, who gave his family the title of Righteous Among the Nations. In 1994 the Government of Hungary gave him the Cross of the Order of Merit of the Republic of Hungary.
In 2015, a Budapest street was renamed in his honor, as Angel Sanz Briz Avenue''.

See also
Francoist Spain and the Holocaust
Raoul Wallenberg, Swedish consul active in Hungary.

References

External links 

 The angel of Budapest - Angel Sanz Briz (1910-1980), by Salvo Haim Alhadeffas in the European Sephardic Institute
 Ángel Sanz Briz: International Raoul Wallenberg foundation
  Angel Sanz Briz (1910-1980)

1910 births
1980 deaths
Spanish people of World War II
Francoist Spain
Spanish Righteous Among the Nations
People who rescued Jews during the Holocaust
Ambassadors of Spain to Belgium
Ambassadors of Spain to China
Ambassadors of Spain to Guatemala
Ambassadors of Spain to Hungary
Ambassadors of Spain to the Netherlands
Ambassadors of Spain to Peru
Ambassadors of Spain to the Holy See
Ambassadors of Spain to Switzerland
Complutense University of Madrid alumni
Recipients of the Order of Merit of the Republic of Hungary
People from Zaragoza